Demanufacturing is a process where a product after extensive usage, often at the end of its lifespan, is then disassembled into components, the components are classified as to functionality and components suitable for reuse are again to returned to a product for reuse, components that are deemed unusable are typically recycled to be used in new products. Demanufacturing was proposed to be used in all industries as a means reduce the environmental footprint while preserving economic viability of the processes involved. This term was first coined by Professor Walter W. Olson and Professor John W. Sutherland in 1993.

In the case of waste electronics demanufacturing involves dismantling them into their components. In the case of material demanufacturing this may be a chemical process, such as in treatment of waste plastics breaking down long polymers into smaller polymers.

Forms of demanufacturing 
There are two forms of demanufacturing: destructive and non-destructive. Non-destructive demanufacturing allows for components to be taken apart and then reused in new products which is what is mainly focused on. However, sometimes destructive demanufacturing has to be used, when this is the case careful preparation is taken and optimal cutting points are used to take the product apart and to take what is needed for reuse.

Economic effects 
There are numerous economic effects that come with demanufacturing. The practice provides numerous jobs to people and communities; in addition the money saved from reusing pieces of products such as screws or other parts saves manufacturers millions. It has been estimated by the  Office of the Federal Environmental Executive that $100 billion in revenue has been generated from this practice.

References

Electronic waste